Kahneh is a village in Bid Shahr Rural District, Evaz District, Larestan County, Fars Province, Iran. At the 2006 census, its population was 2,553, in 518 families.

References 

Populated places in Evaz County